Thanasis Dimitroulas (born 2 March 1999) is a Greek professional footballer who plays as a right-back for Super League 2 club Thesprotos.

Career

Panathinaikos
On 13 June 2017, Dimitroulas signed a professional contract with Panathinaikos.

References

External links

1999 births
Living people
Greece youth international footballers
Super League Greece players
Football League (Greece) players
Panathinaikos F.C. players
Association football defenders
Footballers from Athens
Greek footballers